Baltoji Vokė is a village in Vilnius District Municipality in Lithuania. According to the 2011 census, the town has a population of 369 people.

During the German occupation, a forced labor camp for Jews was located here, approximately 11 kilometers from Vilnius.

References

Vilnius District Municipality
Villages in Vilnius County